IBM 357 Data Collection System is a now obsolete punched card-based terminal system for sending and receiving remote data.

It consisted of:
 IBM 357 Input Station (Badge and/or serial card reader)
 IBM 358 Input Control Unit 
 IBM 360 Clock Read-Out Control
 IBM 361 Read-Out Clock
 IBM 372 Manual Entry
 IBM 373 Punch Switch
 IBM 374 Cartridge Reader
 IBM 013 Badge Punch
 IBM 024/026 Card Punch (81 col)

History 
The IBM 357 system was announced worldwide in 1959. It began to be installed the following year, at libraries, manufacturing plants, etc.

The IBM 1030 Data Collection System and IBM 1050 Data Communications System were typically used in an office environment; the IBM 357 system carried out similar functions in manufacturing plants, for example steel mills.

Many of the devices are described and pictured in 1961 IBM Data Collection in the Factory manual.

References

357